Events in the year 1914 in Bulgaria.

Incumbents

Events 

 23 February – Parliamentary elections were held in the country. The result was a victory for the Liberal Concentration, an alliance of the Liberal Party, the People's Liberal Party and the Young Liberals Party, which won 126 of the 245 seats in the parliament. Voter turnout was 67.1%.
 July 28 – Bulgaria declares "strict and loyal Neutrality"

References 

 
1910s in Bulgaria
Years of the 20th century in Bulgaria
Bulgaria
Bulgaria